Nikita Lalwani FRSL is a novelist born in Kota, Rajasthan and raised in Cardiff, Wales. 

Her work has been translated into sixteen languages. She studied English at Bristol University. 

Her first book, Gifted (2007), was longlisted for the Man Booker Prize and shortlisted for the Costa First Novel Award. Lalwani was nominated as Sunday Times Young Writer of the Year. In June 2008, she won the inaugural Desmond Elliott Prize for Fiction. She donated the £10,000 prize to human rights campaigners, Liberty. 

Lalwani's second book, The Village, was published in 2012 and was selected as one of eight titles for the Fiction Uncovered campaign for the best of British fiction in 2013.

Lalwani has contributed to The Guardian, the New Statesman and The Observer. She has also written for AIDS Sutra, an anthology exploring the lives of people living with HIV/AIDS in India.

In 2013, Lalwani was a book judge for the Orwell Prize. In 2018, she was elected a Fellow of the Royal Society of Literature. She was later a judge for the Royal Society of Literature Encore Prize in 2019. In the same year, she contributed to the anthology Resist: Stories of Uprising. Her novel You People, set in a West London pizzeria where most of the staff are illegal immigrants, was published in 2020 by Penguin and in 2021 by McSweeneys USA. Lalwani co-wrote episode 3 of The Outlaws with Stephen Merchant for BBC One/Amazon Studios, which was broadcast on BBC One on 8 November 2021.

She lives in North London.

References

External links
 Author's website

20th-century births
Year of birth missing (living people)
Living people
21st-century Indian novelists
21st-century Welsh novelists
21st-century Indian women writers
21st-century Welsh women writers
21st-century Welsh writers
Indian emigrants to Wales
People from Kota, Rajasthan
Writers from Cardiff
Alumni of the University of Bristol
British Jains
Welsh novelists
Anglo-Welsh novelists
Welsh women novelists
Indian women novelists
Postcolonial literature
Utopian fiction
Welsh people of Sindhi descent
Novelists from Rajasthan
Date of birth missing (living people)
Recipients of Desmond Elliott Prize